Himani Chawla is an Indian television actress, who made her television debut with Zindagi Badal Sakta Hai Hadsaa in 2008. Moreover, she has also worked in Gunwale Dulhania Le Jayenge, Mata Ki Chowki and Hi! Padosi... Kaun Hai Doshi?. She has also appeared in an episodic of Fear Files: Darr Ki Sacchi Tasvirein and Aahat (season 6).

In 2008, Himani has done Hindi comedy film, Money Hai Toh Honey Hai.

Television
Zee TV's Zindagi Badal Sakta Hai Hadsaa and Fear Files: Darr Ki Sacchi Tasvirein
SAB TV's Gunwale Dulhania Le Jayenge
Sahara One's Mata Ki Chowki and Hi! Padosi... Kaun Hai Doshi?
Sony TV's Aahat (season 6)

References

External link 
 Himani Chawla on IMDb

Living people
Indian television actresses
Actresses from Mumbai
Actresses in Hindi television
Year of birth missing (living people)
Actresses from Indore